Elizabeth Faw Hayden Pizer (born September 1, 1954) is an American  composer, music journalist, archivist and broadcast producer. She was born in Watertown, New York, and studied at the Boston Conservatory of Music in Boston, Massachusetts. Hayden married musician and composer Charles Pizer. She was awarded the First Prize in the 1982 Delius Composition Contest.

Works
Selected works include:
 Elegy for Strings for string orchestra (or string quartet) (1977/79)
 Fanfare Overture for symphonic band (1977/79)
 Look Down, Fair Moon for voice & piano (1976)
 Quilisoly for flute & piano, or violin & piano (1976)
 String Quartet (1981)
 Five Haiku for soprano & chamber ensemble (or soprano & piano reduction) (1978)
 Five Haiku, II for mezzo-soprano & piano (1979)
 Ten Haiku for saxophone & piano (1978/79; arr. 1983)
 Nightsongs for medium voice & piano (texts by Milton Drake)  (1986)
 Shakespeare Set for unaccompanied voice (1978–87)
 Sunken Flutes (electronic tape) (1979)
 Arlington (electronic tape) (1989)
 Embryonic Climactus (electronic tape) (1989)
 The Infinite Sea for electronic tape, or electronic tape & narrator (1990)
 Aquasphere (electronic tape) (1990)

Her work has been recorded and issued on CD, including:
 Romantics: American Piano Music (1992)  North/South Recordings
 Desertscapes -- Music of American Women Composer (1997) MMC Recordings
 New American Piano Music (2001) Innova Recordings

Pizer has published books including:
 Music of the Ancient Near East (New York, 1954)

References

1954 births
20th-century classical composers
American women classical composers
American classical composers
American music educators
American women music educators
Living people
American women in electronic music
20th-century American women musicians
20th-century American composers
20th-century women composers
21st-century American women